The France–Seychelles Delimitation Convention is a 1980 treaty between France and Mauritius which delimits the maritime boundary between Mauritius and the French island of Réunion.

The treaty was signed in Paris on 2 April 1980. The boundary set out by the text of the treaty is 364.8 nautical miles long and trends northeast–southwest. The boundary consists of six straight-line maritime segments defined by seven individual coordinate points. The boundary is an approximate equidistant line between the two territories. The northwest endpoint of the border stops at the exact midway point between Mauritius, Réunion, and Tromelin Island. Tromelin Island is claimed by both France and Mauritius, so the boundary was deliberately terminated to allow for future resolution of the dispute.

The convention came into force immediately upon signature. The full name of the treaty is Convention between the Government of the French Republic and the Government of Mauritius on the delimitation of the French and Mauritian economic zones between the islands of Réunion and Mauritius.

Notes

References
 Anderson, Ewan W. (2003). International Boundaries: A Geopolitical Atlas. Routledge: New York. ;  OCLC 54061586
 Charney, Jonathan I., David A. Colson, Robert W. Smith. (2005). International Maritime Boundaries, 5 vols. Hotei Publishing: Leiden. ; ; ; ; ;  OCLC 23254092

External links
Full text of convention

1980 in Mauritius
1980 in France
Treaties concluded in 1980
Treaties entered into force in 1980
Boundary treaties
Mauritius–Réunion border
Treaties of Mauritius
Bilateral treaties of France